This is a list of ministers from B. S. Yeddyurappa cabinets starting from 30 May 2008 to 31 July 2011. B. S. Yeddyurappa is the leader of Bharatiya Janata Party and was sworn in as the Chief Minister of Karnataka on 30 May 2008. Here is the list of the ministers of his ministry.

Council of Ministers

|}

See also 

 Government of Karnataka
 Karnataka Legislative Assembly

References

Bharatiya Janata Party state ministries
2008 in Indian politics
Yediyurappa 02
2008 establishments in Karnataka
2011 disestablishments in India
Cabinets established in 2008
Cabinets disestablished in 2011